Day-Time Wife is a 1939 comedy directed by Gregory Ratoff, starring Tyrone Power and Linda Darnell. Darnell and Power play Jane and Ken Norton, a married couple approaching their second anniversary. This was Linda Darnell's second film. Day-Time Wife was the first of four films that Darnell and Power made together over the next few years, the others being Brigham Young (1940), The Mark of Zorro (1940), and Blood and Sand (1941).

Plot

Jane comes to believe her husband Ken is having an extramarital affair with his secretary Kitty. To give him a taste of his own medicine, Jane secretly takes a job as secretary to womanizing architect Bernard Dexter, who, unbeknownst to Jane, has a business relationship with Ken.

Cast
 Tyrone Power as Ken Norton  
 Linda Darnell as Jane Norton
 Warren William as Bernard Dexter  
 Binnie Barnes as Blanche  
 Wendy Barrie as Kitty Frazier  
 Joan Davis as Miss Applegate  
 Joan Valerie as Mrs. Dexter  
 Leonid Kinskey as Coco  
 Mildred Gover as Melbourne  
 Renie Riano as Miss Briggs

Production
Despite playing a married woman, star Linda Darnell was only 16 years old at the time of filming, having been born on October 16, 1923. Fox studio executive Darryl F. Zanuck added two years to her real age when he signed her to a contract.

References

External links
 
 
 

1939 films
American black-and-white films
1939 comedy films
American comedy films
Films directed by Gregory Ratoff
20th Century Fox films
1930s American films